The 2016 Amstel Gold Race was a one-day classic cycling race that took place in the Limburg region of the Netherlands on 17 April 2016. It was the 51st edition of the Amstel Gold Race and the eleventh event of the 2016 UCI World Tour. It was also the first of the Ardennes classics, although it is technically not in the Ardennes region. The race took place over a  route that starts in Maastricht and ends in Berg en Terblijt on the outskirts of Valkenburg. The key difficulty in the race came from the 34 short but steep climbs. The favourites for victory in the race included the three-time winner Philippe Gilbert (BMC), the defending champion Michał Kwiatkowski (Sky), and Simon Gerrans and Michael Matthews (both ).

There were numerous attacks in the first part of the race, but no group had a significant advantage in the last part of the race. Tim Wellens had a small lead on the final climb of the Cauberg, but he was caught before the summit by a large group led by Orica–GreenEDGE. Towards the summit of the climb, Enrico Gasparotto, the 2012 champion, attacked; he was joined by 's Michael Valgren and the two came to the finish together, with Gasparotto winning the sprint for victory. Sonny Colbrelli was third in the main group, which finished four seconds behind.

Route 

The route covered  and included 34 classified climbs; as in the other Ardennes classics (La Flèche Wallonne and Liège–Bastogne–Liège), the main difficulty came from the short but steep climbs. The route started in Maastricht and travelled north to the outskirts of Geleen for the first three climbs of the day. The route turned east to Voerendaal for the fourth climb, then west for the first climb of the Sibbergrubbe. This took the riders into Valkenburg aan de Geul and onto the first of four climbs of the Cauberg, where there was a series of three circuits, each shorter than the last. The first circuit took the riders on a long loop to the south of Valkenburg as far as Vaals. This included the first climb of the Geulhemmerberg, then fifteen more climbs. These included the Loorberg and the Gulpenerberg for the first time and the Sibbergrubbe and the Cauberg for the second time. The second climb of the Cauberg came with  completed and  remaining.

The second circuit again took the riders south, through the town of Gulpen. This circuit included the Bemelerberg for the first time, the Geulhemmerberg, the Loorberg and the Gulpenerberg for the second time and then the Cauberg for the third time. The circuit included the third climb of the Sibbergrubbe, then the second climb of the Bemelerberg and finally the fourth climb of the Cauberg.

The Cauberg was expected to be the decisive climb in the race. The first two climbs were expected to be raced gently, but the final two times were expected to be central to the race's outcome. The Cauberg itself is an  climb with an average gradient of 6.5% and a maximum gradient of 12.8%. Additional difficulty was created throughout the route by the roads that frequently turned back on themselves and by the high density of traffic calming devices. Cyclingnews.com described the route as "technically demanding" and "a fertile ground for crashes", adding that local knowledge was valuable.

Participating teams 

The race organisers invited 25 teams to participate in the 2016 Amstel Gold Race. As it is a UCI World Tour event, all 18 UCI WorldTeams were invited automatically and were obliged to send a squad. An additional seven UCI Professional Continental teams were given wildcard entries. These included two Belgian teams ( and ), a Dutch team, two Italian teams ( and ), a Polish team and a French team.

Pre-race favourites 

He won that race by catching up with the leading riders on the flat section following the final climb and outsprinting them at the line. He was also in strong form, having won the E3 Harelbeke a few weeks previously. Kwiatkowski was considered to able both to attack on the final climb and also to win from a small group sprint.

The previous champion was Philippe Gilbert, who had won the race a total of three times as well as winning the 2012 world championships road race that finished with the same Cauberg finale. He had won the 2014 edition by escaping on the climb and, with the assistance of a tailwind, staying away to the finish. Gilbert had recently been involved in an altercation with a driver in which he had broken a finger; he missed Brabantse Pijl in order to have metal pins inserted and it was unclear whether he would be able to play a major part in the race.

 had two major favourites for the race: Michael Matthews and Simon Gerrans. Matthews had been third in 2015, while Gerrans had finished third on three other occasions. They were declared to be "joint leaders" by their team, but in the 2015 road race world championships had sprinted against one another, despite being on the same team. Gerrans in particular was in good form, following his performance in the 2016 Tour of the Basque Country, while Matthews had declared the Amstel Gold Race to be one of the main objectives of his season.

The last rider to win the race from a long-range breakaway had been Roman Kreuziger in 2013, but he had failed to perform well in the race since then. Other possible winners included 's Julian Alaphilippe and Petr Vakoč, 's Daniel Moreno, 's Enrico Gasparotto (the 2012 champion), 's Simon Geschke, 's Tony Gallopin, 's Edvald Boasson Hagen and 's Fabio Felline.

Race summary 

In the neutral section before the official start of the race, Fabio Felline crashed. He was reaching down to adjust something at the front of his bike; his wheel then jammed and the bike stopped abruptly. Felline was thrown over the handlebars and hit the ground face first. He broke his nose and suffered a fracture at the base of his skull. The injuries put him out of both the Amstel Gold Race and the rest of the Ardennes week.

When the racing started, it took  for a breakaway to form. Eleven riders escaped and, over the following , built a four-minute lead. The riders in the breakaway were Alex Howes, Laurent Didier (Trek–Segafredo), Matteo Montaguti, Laurens De Vreese, Matteo Bono, Kévin Reza, Larry Warbasse, Fabien Grellier, Giacomo Berlato, Tom Devriendt and Josef Černý. Their lead reached five minutes at the foot of the first ascent of the Cauberg. In the peloton, Sky, Orica–GreenEDGE and AG2R La Mondiale led the chase and the lead was reduced to just over three minutes when they crossed the finish line for the second time. Rain began to fall, causing a crash for Joaquim Rodríguez.

With  remaining, a four-man group broke free of the peloton. The riders were Tosh Van der Sande (Lotto–Soudal), Niccolò Bonifazio (Trek–Segafredo), Gianni Meersman (Etixx–Quick-Step) and Björn Thurau (Wanty–Groupe Gobert). They were chased unsuccessfully by Andriy Hrivko (Astana); the four-man group reduced the breakaway's advantage to 90 seconds. On the Gulpenerberg, Reza and Didier were dropped from the breakaway, which had a two-minute lead over the peloton. Michael Albasini (Orica–GreenEDGE) attacked in the main group but was chased by Team Sky; Orica–GreenEDGE then brought the four-man chasing group back before the summit of the Keutenberg. With  remaining, Philippe Gilbert and Edvald Boasson Hagen were dropped.

On the penultimate climb of the Cauberg, the breakaway was reduced to five riders, who had a fifteen-second lead. Bob Jungels (Etixx–Quick-Step) and Enrico Battaglin attacked from the peloton, while Michał Kwiatkowski was among the riders dropped. Orica–GreenEDGE continued to lead the peloton with Albasini and Mathew Hayman, the winner of Paris–Roubaix the previous week. The breakaway was caught with  remaining. Roman Kreuziger attacked with  remaining; there was an immediate counter-attack from Tim Wellens (Lotto–Soudal), who passed Kreuziger and earned a fifteen-second lead at the bottom of the final climb of the Cauberg.

As Albasini brought Wellens back on the Cauberg, Enrico Gasparotto attacked. He was followed by Tinkoff's Michael Valgren at the top of the climb. Despite a brief attack from Jelle Vanendert (Lotto–Soudal), no one in the peloton seemed willing to put the effort into catching the leading pair. Valgren did a long pull at the front of the race, with Gasparotto in his wheel. At the finish line, Gasparotto was easily able to come around him to take his second Amstel Gold Race victory. Sonny Colbrelli (Bardiani–CSF) won the sprint for third place.

Result

Post-race analysis

Reactions 

The race was Gasparotto's first win since his first Amstel Gold triumph in 2012. He crossed the line pointing to the sky in a reference to his former teammate Antoine Demoitié, who had been killed in an accident at Gent–Wevelgem two weeks previously. Cycling Weekly described his victory as "emotional". Gasparotto himself had not been at Demoitié's funeral as he had been training on Mount Teide in Tenerife. He had been encouraged by Demoitié's widow the previous day and said that he had felt a "really big responsibility" and had not wanted to let his teammates down. He also said that, as in his 2012 victory, he had used the 39-tooth inner ring for most of the climb and had only changed to the 53-tooth outer ring at the summit, for the flat section towards the finish line. Gasparotto also credited his victory to Valgren's presence with him, as Valgren was willing to pull hard in the final kilometre.

Valgren, meanwhile, said that his second-place finish was a "big result" for him. Because Valgren was so determined to stay ahead of the chasing group, Gasparotto was able to sit in behind him and come past at the finish when Valgren was tired. Nonetheless, he said that he was happy with his performance and that he hoped to come back and win the race in the future. Cyclingnews.com described the result as "a big step up" for him. Colbrelli, however, said that he had "mixed feelings" about his third-place finish. He said that the calibre of the riders who had finished behind him demonstrated that he had ridden "a great race" but also that he had "waited for too long" to try to bring the leading pair back.

Kwiatkowski tweeted after the race that the weather had been a factor in his disappointing performance: he wrote "I tried my hardest but the hail with rain froze my hands, feet, legs, back and, finally, my thoughts and ambitions." His team's directeur sportif, Kurt Asle Arvesen, said that he "didn't have good legs" and that the two Sky riders in the group at the end of the race – Sergio Henao and Lars Petter Nordhaug – had been unable to go with the attack on the Cauberg and were not strong enough to compete with the sprinters at the finish.

UCI World Tour standings 

There were no significant changes in the standings of the season-long 2016 UCI World Tour competition. Because Gasparotto, Colbrelli and Bryan Coquard all rode for Professional Continental teams rather than World Teams, they did not earn any World Tour points. Valgren's second-place finish earned him 60 points; this put him in 25th place in the individual standings but it also helped Tinkoff to an increased lead in the team standings. Australia, meanwhile, retained a two-point lead over Belgium in the nations' standings.

References

External links 

 
 
 

2016 in Dutch sport
2016 UCI World Tour
Amstel Gold Race